The Cosmopolitan Club in London, England, was a club which existed from 1852 to 1902. It met in rooms at 30 Charles Street, off Berkeley Square, which had previously been the studio of George Frederic Watts and then of Henry Wyndham Phillips.

The membership was limited to 60, and included literary men, artists, civil servants and political figures. Watts joined, as did the writers Matthew James Higgins (Jacob Omnium), Francis Turner Palgrave, Edward Fitzgerald and Anthony Trollope. Other members included the Prince of Wales, Henry Layard, Sir Robert Morier, James Spedding and William Gladstone.

The club was "largely renowned for conversation", and is said to be the basis of "The Universe", "the club where the best informed political gossip is heard", in Trollope's novel Phineas Redux. It met every Sunday and Wednesday evening for the greater part of the year.

The meeting room was dominated by a large painting by Watts of a naked damsel in distress. The painting, A Story from Boccaccio, depicted the woman fleeing towards a group of classically dressed figures. It was presented to the nation when the club closed.

References

Gentlemen's clubs in London
1852 establishments in England
1902 disestablishments in the United Kingdom
Mayfair